New Zealand General Service Medal 2002 may refer to one of the following medals of New Zealand:

 New Zealand General Service Medal 2002 (Solomon Islands)
 New Zealand General Service Medal 2002 (Afghanistan), Primary Operations Area
 New Zealand General Service Medal 2002 (Afghanistan), Secondary Operations Area
 New Zealand General Service Medal 2002 (Iraq 2003)
 New Zealand General Service Medal 2002 (Timor-Leste)
 New Zealand General Service Medal 2002 (Korea)
 New Zealand General Service Medal 2002 (Greater Middle East)
 New Zealand General Service Medal 2002 (Iraq 2015)
 New Zealand General Service Medal 2002 (Counter-Piracy)